Zeenat Quraishi Karzai (born 1970) is the wife of former President of Afghanistan Hamid Karzai and was the First Lady of Afghanistan from 2001 to 2014. Originally from the city of Kandahar, she moved to Kabul, where she lived at the Arg (the Presidential palace) with her husband and their four children.

Education and career 
Born in 1970 and raised in Kandahar, Afghanistan, the daughter of a civil servant, Zenat Quraishi moved to Kabul after high school to attend Kabul University.

She was a gynaecologist by profession and worked in hospitals treating Afghan refugees in Pakistan before she married Hamid Karzai.

Family 
She is an ethnic Pashtun.  Zeenat belongs to the Quraish family line and her husband Karzai is from the Popalzai tribe.

In 1993, she and her family escaped from the civil war to neighboring Quetta in Balochistan, Pakistan.

She is a distant relative of Hamid Karzai.

They have one son and three daughters.

For a president who has been credited for helping the women of Afghanistan regain their civil rights, Karzai has been criticized for being overly conservative with his own spouse. Many have accused Karzai of keeping the first lady out of the media’s reach over fears of criticism from conservative mullahs and religious leaders.

See also

 Rula Ghani
 Queens of Afghanistan

References

First ladies of Afghanistan
Living people
Hamid Karzai
Zeenat
Pashtun women
People from Kandahar
2000s in Afghanistan
2010s in Afghanistan
21st-century Afghan politicians
21st-century Afghan women politicians
1970 births